Olivier Bauchau is an American aerospace engineer,  the Igor Sikorsky Distinguished Professor in Rotorcraft at University of Maryland, College Park, and a published author. he is a member of the American Institute of Aeronautics and Astronautics, American Society of Mechanical Engineers and American Helicopter Society.

References

American aerospace engineers
Year of birth missing (living people)
Living people
University of Maryland, College Park faculty